Saradindu Mukherjee  (born 5 October 1964, in Kolkata, India) is a former Indian cricketer. He played domestic cricket for Bengal and played three One Day Internationals for India in 1990–91.

He is remembered for his heroics in the 1990-91 Asia Cup where he was India's preferred spinner in the tournament, ahead of Venkatapathy Raju and Ravi Shastri. Mukherjee conceded 3.37 runs an over in the tournament from 29 overs. Despite being the most miserly of the Indian bowlers, he never played for India again. Of all Indian bowlers who have bowled 75 balls since 1990, Mukherjee has been the most economic.

Saradindu Mukherjee is also credited for having taken a hat-trick on his Ranji Trophy debut.

References

Bengal cricketers
Indian cricketers
India One Day International cricketers
East Zone cricketers
1964 births
Living people